Isariopsis is a genus of fungi in the family Mycosphaerellaceae. The plant disease called isariopsis leaf spot is actually caused by Pseudocercospora vitis, formerly known as I. vitis.

Species
The following species are accepted within Isariopsis:
Isariopsis cirsii
Isariopsis clavispora
Isariopsis geranii
Isariopsis indica
Isariopsis kamatii
Isariopsis magnoliae
Isariopsis muehlenbeckiae

References

External links
 Index Fungorum

Mycosphaerellaceae genera
Fungi described in 1863
Mycosphaerellaceae